Chorrillos may refer to

Places 
 Chorrillos River, Argentina
 Chorrillos, Tarija Department, Bolivia
 Chorrillos, Chile
 Antofagasta
 Valparaiso
 Chorrillos District, Lima, Peru
Chorrillos, Peru, a southern suburb of Lima

Other 
Association Chorrillos football club in Chorrillos, Lima
Battle of Chorrillos in the War of the Pacific, around Chorrillos, Lima
 Chorrillos Military School in Chorrillos, Lima
Sport Chorrillos football club in Piura, Peru